Erythranthe floribunda is a species of monkeyflower known by the common name many-flowered monkeyflower. It is native to western North America from western Canada to California and northern Mexico, to the Rocky Mountains. It grows in many types of habitat, especially moist areas. It was formerly known as Mimulus floribundus.

Description 
This plant is variable in morphology, taking several forms. In general it is an annual herb with a thin stem 3 to 50 centimeters long, growing upright or decumbent. In texture it is hairy and sometimes slimy. The oppositely arranged leaves vary in size and shape. The tubular base of the flower is encapsulated in a hairy calyx of sepals with pointed lobes. The corolla of the flower is yellow and up to 1.5 centimeters long.

References

External links
Calflora Database: Mimulus floribundus (Floriferous monkeyflower, Many flowered monkey flower
Jepson Manual eFlora (TJM2) treatment of Mimulus floribundus
USDA Plants Profile for Mimulus floribundus (manyflowered monkeyflower)
U.C. Photos gallery − Mimulus floribundus

floribunda
Flora of the Northwestern United States
Flora of the Southwestern United States
Flora of California
Flora of the Sierra Nevada (United States)
Natural history of the California chaparral and woodlands
Natural history of the Peninsular Ranges
Natural history of the Transverse Ranges
Flora without expected TNC conservation status